Very Big in America Right Now is an album by Adrian Sherwood issued under the moniker Voice of Authority. It was released in October 1984 by Cherry Red Records and On-U Sound Records. "Knock the House Down" is a remixed version of "Blessed Are Those Who Struggle" from Mark Stewart's 1983 debut album Learning to Cope with Cowardice.

Track listing

Personnel 

Musicians
Keith Logan – vocals (B1)
Eskimo Fox – drums (B4)
Shara Nelson – vocals (A4)
Nick Plytas – keyboards
Adrian Sherwood – vocals, drums, producer
Evar Wellington – bass guitar (B4, B5)
Kishi Yamamoto – keyboards

Technical personnel
Kevin Metcalfe – mastering

Release history

References

External links 
 

1984 albums
Adrian Sherwood albums
Cherry Red Records albums
On-U Sound Records albums
Albums produced by Adrian Sherwood